The 1994 Hall of Fame Tennis Championships, also known by its sponsored name Miller Lite Hall of Fame Tennis Championships, was a men's tennis tournament played on outdoor grass courts at the Newport Casino  in Newport, Rhode Island, United States that was part of the World Series of the 1994 ATP Tour. It was the 21st edition of the tournament and was held from July 4 through July 10, 1994 Unseeded David Wheaton won the singles title.

Finals

Singles

 David Wheaton defeated  Todd Woodbridge 6–4, 3–6, 7–6(7–5)
 It was Wheaton's 1st singles title of the year and the 3rd of his career.

Doubles

 Alex Antonitsch /  Greg Rusedski defeated  Kent Kinnear /  David Wheaton 6–4, 3–6, 6–4

References

External links
 ITF tournament edition details

Hall of Fame Tennis Championships
Hall of Fame Open
Hall of Fame Tennis Championships
Hall of Fame Tennis Championships
Hall of Fame Tennis Championships